The 2018 Silverstone FIA Formula 2 round was a pair of motor races held on 7 and 8 July 2018 at the Silverstone Circuit in Silverstone, United Kingdom as part of the FIA Formula 2 Championship. It was the seventh round of the 2018 FIA Formula 2 Championship and ran in support of the 2018 British Grand Prix.

ART Grand Prix driver George Russell entered the round with a ten-point lead over Lando Norris in the drivers' championship. In the teams' championship, Carlin held a twenty-seven point lead over ART Grand Prix.

This round was also notable for a collision at the end of the sprint race involving Trident teammates Arjun Maini and Santino Ferrucci. Ferrucci was deemed to have deliberately hit the back of Maini's car on the cooldown lap, and he was then banned for the next two rounds by the FIA. He was then sacked from Trident ten days later due to sponsorship issues, and his replacement would be their GP3 Series driver Alessio Lorandi.

Report

Background
The round saw the continued use of rolling starts following a series of drivers stalling on the grid in previous rounds. The procedure was introduced at the previous round in response to a start-line accident in a Formula 3 race that saw a driver crash into a car that had stalled on the grid.

The circuit featured three Drag Reduction System (DRS) zones. The two used in previous years—positioned on the Wellington and Hangar Straights—returned, with a third zone placed on the main straight. As DRS is deactivated when the driver brakes, drivers were able to use the system through the Abbey and Farm corners as these corners could be taken flat-out when the car is low on fuel. This brought increased risk as DRS reduces drag by reducing downforce, with aerodynamic grip improving the car's ability to take corners at speed. Drivers were able to manually deactivate DRS before the corners if they were unable or unwilling to take the corner without the use of DRS. The race marked the first time that drivers were able to use DRS through corners.

Classification

Qualifying

Feature race

Notes
 – George Russell had five seconds added to his race time for speeding in the pit lane.
 – Jack Aitken had ten seconds added to his race time; five for speeding in the pit lane and five for a VSC infringement.
 – Santino Ferrucci had five seconds added to his race time for forcing Arjun Maini off the circuit.

Sprint race

Notes
 – Luca Ghiotto received a 5-second time penalty for failing to maintain the minimum delta time at the end of the virtual safety car period.
 – Santino Ferrucci has been disqualified from the Sprint race and banned for the next two rounds by the FIA following collision with teammate Arjun Maini.
 – Sérgio Sette Câmara set the fastest lap in the race but because he finished outside the top 10, the two bonus points for fastest lap went to George Russell as he set the fastest lap inside the top 10 finishers.

Championship standings after the round

Drivers' Championship standings

Teams' Championship standings

References

External links 
 

Silverstone
Formula 2
Formula 2